Acts 6 is the sixth chapter of the Acts of the Apostles in the New Testament of the Christian Bible. It records the ordination of the first seven deacons and the work of one of them, Stephen. The book containing this chapter is anonymous but early Christian tradition uniformly affirmed that Luke composed this book as well as the Gospel of Luke.

Text

The original text was written in Koine Greek and is divided into 15 verses.

Textual witnesses
Some early manuscripts containing the text of this chapter are:
 Codex Vaticanus (AD 325–350)
 Codex Sinaiticus (330–360)
 Papyrus 8 (4th century; extant verses 1–6, 8–15)
 Codex Bezae (~400)
 Codex Alexandrinus (400–440)
 Codex Ephraemi Rescriptus (~450; lacunae: verse 8)
 Codex Laudianus (~550)

Appointment of the Seven (6:1-7)
In this part Luke provides 'a brief glimpse into the inner workings of the church', bracketed with 'two summary verses'. The candidates to perform the care functions in the community are marked out as 'full of the Spirit' (verses 3, 5), and 'the transmission of authority from the apostles' is 'very deliberately assured through prayer and the laying on of hands' (verse 6).

Verse 5
 And the saying pleased the whole multitude. And they chose Stephen, a man full of faith and the Holy Spirit, and Philip, Prochorus, Nicanor, Timon, Parmenas, and Nicolas, a proselyte from Antioch,
All the selected seven men have Greek names (verse 5) suggesting a 'diaspora connection', although many Palestinian Jews at the time also spoke Greek.

Stephen on trial (6:8–7:1)
One of the seven, Stephen, soon gets into dispute, not with the temple hierarchy, but with members of a group of diaspora synagogues in Jerusalem (6:9).

Verse 9
Then there arose some from what is called the Synagogue of the Freedmen (Cyrenians, Alexandrians, and those from Cilicia and Asia), disputing with Stephen.
"Synagogue of the Freedmen" (KJV: "synagogue of the Libertines"): A particular synagogue in Jerusalem which is attended by former slaves, or "freemen", and may include their descendants. The word "Freedmen" or ""libertine" is from a Latin title libertini indicating "a group of Jews of Italian origin who were now settled in Jerusalem" and this term is also known from Latin sources, such as Tacitus, Annals, 2:85. The Theodotus inscription provides the evidence that 'there was at least one Greek-speaking synagogue in Jerusalem in the first century'.

Verse 14
[False witnesses from the Synagogue of the Freedmen said]: "for we have heard him say that this Jesus of Nazareth will destroy this place and change the customs which Moses delivered to us."

See also 
 Philip the Evangelist
 Sanhedrin
 Saint Stephen
 Other related Bible parts: Acts 7, Acts 8, Acts 21

References

Sources

External links
 King James Bible - Wikisource
English Translation with Parallel Latin Vulgate
Online Bible at GospelHall.org (ESV, KJV, Darby, American Standard Version, Bible in Basic English)
Multiple bible versions at Bible Gateway (NKJV, NIV, NRSV etc.)

06